"I'm Holdin' On to Love (To Save My Life)" is a song co-written and recorded by Canadian country music singer Shania Twain.  It is the twelfth and final single from her double-Diamond certified third studio album Come on Over.  It was written by Robert John "Mutt" Lange and Twain.  The song was originally released to North American country radio stations in July 2000.  With no promotional  performances, or commercial single, the song was still able to reach considerable chart success, peaking at 2 on the Billboard Bubbling Under Hot 100 and becoming her second longest running single on the chart after "You Win My Love". It also reached the 20 of the Billboard Country Singles chart peaking at number 17. It is also the only single from the album released without an accompanying music video. "I'm Holdin' On to Love" was performed on the Come On Over Tour, in a medley on the Up! Tour, and on Twain's 2003 NBC special Up! Close and Personal. The song is commonly cited as a "fan favorite" from Twain's career, despite her not performing or mentioning the song in almost two decades.

Critical reception
Billboard magazine reviewed the song favorably, saying "This is one of those little tunes that pushes all the right buttons that Twain and Lange have engaged so successfully before. Look for it to follow its predecessors up the chart."

Official versions
Original Country Version (3:30)
International Version (3:30)
Pop Mix (3:44)
Live from Dallas (3:27)
Live from Up! Close and Personal (3:24)

Chart performance 
"I'm Holdin' On to Love" debuted on the Billboard Hot Country Singles & Tracks chart the week of July 8, 2000 at number 66. The single spent 21 weeks on the chart and slowly climbed to a peak position of number 17 on November 11, 2000, where it remained for two weeks. "I'm Holdin' On to Love" became the tenth top 20 single from Come On Over, her 16th overall. The song went on to top the Hot Country Recurrents chart for one week. "I'm Holdin' On to Love" was the final single from Come On Over, and peaked three years after the album's debut, which was released on November 4, 1997. The song also reached the second spot of the Bubbling Under Hot 100 chart on November 4, 2000.

Charts

References

2000 singles
1997 songs
Shania Twain songs
Songs written by Robert John "Mutt" Lange
Song recordings produced by Robert John "Mutt" Lange
Songs written by Shania Twain
Mercury Records singles
Mercury Nashville singles
country rock songs
pop rock songs